Cacolet may refer to:
Camel cacolet, for field transport of wounded soldiers
Mule cacolet, ditto
Cacolet, journal of the Australian Camel Field Ambulance (see Australian Army Medical Units, World War I)
Tricoche et Cacolet, a notable 19th Century French fictional detective team
Caçolet, meaning cassoulet